Central Phuket is a shopping mall in Phuket, Thailand. There was a major expansion with the construction of the  "Floresta" building in 2018.

Central Phuket consists of two modernly designed buildings (Festival and Floresta) linked by moving walkways. It features 15 luxury brands, 500 lifestyle shops, 300 F&B outlets and three main attractions on 111 rai of land located in downtown Phuket. It is the largest shopping center and includes extensive food service and entertainment that consists of an aquarium and adventure theme park.

Festival

Festival, the original building, was redesigned to align with the beaches and blue seas of Phuket, both inside and out, expressing the concept of “Andaman Treasure”. Catering to a variety of lifestyles, Central Phuket hosts a variety of activities from dawn to dusk. There are designated recreational areas for relaxing and socializing.

Floresta

Floresta, a recent addition to Central Phuket, is decorated with nature motifs and incorporating various aspects of Thai art, culture, literature, and modern architecture.

See also
 List of largest shopping malls

External links
Official website

References

Shopping malls in Thailand
Buildings and structures in Phuket province